James Alexander McDonald (8 December 1883 – August 1924) was a Scottish professional footballer who played as a forward.

Career
McDonald moved from St Bernard's to Bradford City in April 1907, representing them in the 1911 FA Cup Final, and captaining the team before World War I. In 1920, he signed for Raith Rovers.

Personal life
McDonald served as a gunner in the Royal Field Artillery during the First World War.

References

External links

1883 births
1924 deaths
Scottish footballers
St Bernard's F.C. players
Bradford City A.F.C. players
Raith Rovers F.C. players
English Football League players
British Army personnel of World War I
Association football inside forwards
Association football wing halves
Royal Field Artillery soldiers
Scottish Football League players
Inverness Thistle F.C. players
People from Peterhead
Footballers from Aberdeenshire
FA Cup Final players